Bruno Heckel (10 April 1887 – 2 January 1929) was a German wrestler. He competed in the lightweight event at the 1912 Summer Olympics.

References

External links
 

1887 births
1929 deaths
Olympic wrestlers of Germany
Wrestlers at the 1912 Summer Olympics
German male sport wrestlers
Sportspeople from Saxony